Alexander Stadium is a track and field athletics stadium in Perry Park, Birmingham, England. It hosted the athletics and opening/closing ceremonies of the 2022 Commonwealth Games. Other events held there include the annual British Grand Prix between 2011 and 2019 and in 2022, the Amateur Athletics Association Championships, 1998 Disability World Athletics Championships, and  English Schools' Athletics Championships. The Stadium will also host the Midlands Hurricanes rugby league team from 2023 onwards.

Original construction began in 1975 and the stadium opened in 1976. It is owned and operated by Birmingham City Council. Birchfield Harriers use it as their home stadium, replacing their former home at Alexander Sports Ground. The stadium underwent a renovation between 2019 and 2022, to prepare it for hosting the Commonwealth Games.

Structure
The stadium has a nine-lane synthetic surface track with a blue surface. Before redevelopment, there were 7,000 covered seats in three separate stands called Main, Knowles (after Dick Knowles) and Nelson (after Doris Nelson Neal OBE), and a 5,000-seater stand on the rear straight.

Diamond League 
Since 2011 Alexander Stadium has hosted the prestigious world athletics Diamond League tour until 2019 ahead of the redevelopment. Birmingham held the 2nd series of the 2022 tour on May 21, 2022.

Music events
The stadium has held many music events, including a one-day festival called Party in the Park run by BRMB (now Free Radio Birmingham) radio that featured acts including Nelly Furtado, Westlife, Natasha Bedingfield, Blue, Sugababes, Debbie McGee, Girls Aloud and The Calling. The event was later moved to Cannon Hill Park where it was in a more central part of the city and so made it easier for people from south Birmingham to attend.

Expansion

2011 
In 2011 Alexander Stadium underwent a £12.5 million expansion and refurbishment, including the building of a 5,000-seater stand opposite the current main stand. This took the capacity to 12,700. The new stand has also become home to the offices of UK Athletics. The stand was completed in June 2011, in time to host the Diamond League British Grand Prix in July 2011.

2017–present 
In June 2017, during the preparation of the Birmingham bid for the 2022 Commonwealth Games, the Birmingham bid committee proposed to renovate Alexander Stadium and use it for hosting the athletics and ceremonies of the Games.

On 11 April 2018, British Prime Minister Theresa May announced that £70 million (approx. USD $90 million) of investment would be earmarked to transform the Alexander Stadium into a world-class athletics venue for the 2022 Commonwealth Games, during which it will seat 40,000 spectators. In October 2018, British engineering and designing firm Arup was chosen by the Birmingham City Council to redesign the stadium. British construction firm Mace was chosen to manage the stadium renovation project.

On 21 June 2019, Birmingham City Council released the images and plans for renovating the Alexander Stadium and claimed that it would create a legacy asset for the Perry Barr area.

On 30 January 2020, Birmingham City Council's planning committee approved the renovation plans of the Alexander Stadium which would cost £72 million. After the games, the temporary stands around the track bends will be removed, leaving the two permanent stands seating 18,000, with the option of extending to 40,000 for major events. In March 2020, the city council chose the Northern Irish firm McLaughlin & Harvey to redevelop the stadium.

Birmingham 2022 Commonwealth Games 

Alexander Stadium was the main venue for athletics, para-athletics as well as holding the opening and closing ceremonies.

The redeveloped stadium included temporary seating and facilities to accommodate the games. Birmingham City Council will remove these and reopen the stadium in legacy format by April 2023.

Future use 
Following the awarding of the  2026 European Athletics Championships to Birmingham, Alexander Stadium will serve as the venue for the championships.

Incidents
On 22 March 2016 fell-runner Lauren Jeska from Lancaster attacked UK Athletics official Ralph Knibbs at the stadium, stabbing him multiple times. Jeska had feared her records in women's events would be quashed due to her transgender identity. She later pleaded guilty to attempted murder and was sentenced to 30 years' imprisonment. She was also convicted of causing actual bodily harm to two bystanders who tried to defend Knibbs.

References

External links

Birmingham City Council page on the stadium
Runtrackdir.com

Sports venues in Birmingham, West Midlands
Athletics (track and field) venues in England
Sports venues completed in 1976
Birchfield Harriers
1976 establishments in England
Perry Barr
American football venues in England
Diamond League venues
2022 Commonwealth Games venues
Athletics at the 2022 Commonwealth Games
Rugby league stadiums in England